Yelizarov or Elizarov is a Russian masculine surname deriving from the name Eleazar, its feminine counterpart is Yelizarova or Elizarova. It may refer to:

Aleksandr Elizarov (born 1952), Soviet biathlete
Darya Elizarova (born 1991), Russian-born Uzbekistani gymnast
Ilya Yelizarov (born 1963), member of the State Duma of Russia
Katia Elizarova (born 1986), Russian model and actress
Prokopy Yelizarov, Russian statesman of 17th century, the voivod of Solikamsk province during the rule of Alexis I

See also
Yelizarov Monastery, small convent founded in 1447 to the north of Pskov by a local peasant named Eleazar

Russian-language surnames